Three ships of the United States Navy have been named USS Iwo Jima, in memory of the Battle of Iwo Jima.  

  was the lead ship of the s, she served from 1961 to 1993. Scrapped 1995.
She was commissioned into active service in 2001 and is still in service today.

United States Navy ship names